Tulipa alberti, or Albert's tulip, is a species of flowering plant in the family Liliaceae. It has long reddish, orange or pink flowers. It comes from the mountains of Central Asia.

Description

It has 3-4 leaves, which are glaucous green, without blotches, and broad. They are lanceolate (lance shaped), or crispate (curled).

It has a solitary flower, which blooms in mid spring, in April.

The cup-shaped flower, is similar in shape to those of Tulipa greigii, or Tulipa armena.

The blossoms come in a range of colours, from orange with reddish tint, to orange, orange-pink, red, and dark claret. There is an occasional yellow form.

The flowers have 3 inner petals and 3 outer petals. Normally the three inner tepals of T. alberti are obtuse, and folded to the inside, and the three outer tepals are sub-acute, and folded to the outside. The petals are marked at the base with a blotch of lemon yellow, or yellow margined with red-brown, dark purple, or black. The rare yellow forms of both T. greigii and T. alberti can have a crimson blotch on the inner side of the petal.

In the stamen, it has 2.9 cm long stamens, small yellow, filaments 1.4 cm long and anthers similar in length to the filaments, which are dark purple in shade, or sometimes yellow in the pale coloured forms.

After flowering, it produces a seed capsule. 
It has a light green, cylindrical ovary, which is 2.2 cm long and 0.7 cm wide.
The ovoid with tapering tops, seed capsule is 4.3 cm long and 2.5 cm wide. Inside are bright brown, sub-triangular seeds, 0.6 cm long and  0.5 cm wide.

Biochemistry
Most tulips are diploid, having two sets of chromosomes. Most species of Tulipa have the same basic chromosome number, 2n = 2x = 24.

Natural cytokinin-like substances were found in ethanol extracts from the bulbs.

Taxonomy
The genus name (of Tulipa) comes the Latinized version of the Turkish name tulbend meaning a turban.

It is commonly known as Albert’s tulip.

The specific epithet alberti, refers Johann Albert von Regel, who was the son of Eduard August von Regel. Johann was with him while he collected during a botanical excursions in Turkestan and in the Pamir region of Central Asia.

T. alberti was originally found in Turkestan, and then described and published by Eduard August von Regel (1815–1892), German botanist in Trudy Imp. S.-Peterburgsk. Bot. Sada (Proceedings of the Petersburg Botanical Garden) Vol.5 on page 264 in 1877. It was also published by Regel in Gartenflora Vol.26 on page 257 in 1877.

In taxonomic theory, it should be called albertii (with an extra i at the end), but due to the results of a taxonomic conference Shenzhen ICN Art. 60.8, it was deemed permissible to leave it as alberti. It is also an accepted name and was verified by United States Department of Agriculture and the Agricultural Research Service on 16 November 1993. 
Some sources still call it Tulipa albertii.

Distribution and habitat

It is native to the temperate areas of Central Asia, or Middle Asia.

Range
It is found in Kazakhstan, Kyrgyzstan (around Lake Balkhash,) and Uzbekistan.

It is found on the Tien Shan mountains (crossing the three countries), alongside other tulips such as Tulipa kaufmanniana and Tulip zenaidae (now classed as a synonym of Tulipa lehmanniana Merckl.).

Habitat
It grows on the gravelly slopes.

Culture
In 1997, a set of stamps with images of tulips was released in Kazakhstan. The series included, Tulipa regelii, Tulipa greigii and Tulipa alberti.

References

Other sources
 Huxley, A., ed. 1992. The new Royal Horticultural Society dictionary of gardening
 Komarov, V. L. et al., eds. 1934-1964. Flora SSSR.
 Raamsdonk, L. W. D. van & T. de Vries. 1995. Species relationships and taxonomy in Tulipa subg. Tulipa (Liliaceae). Pl. Syst. Evol. 195:40.
 Walters, S. M. et al., eds. 1986-2000. European garden flora.

External links
 

alberti
Plants described in 1877
Flora of Kyrgyzstan
Flora of Kazakhstan
Flora of Uzbekistan